Joseph Chessar Watt (June 18, 1919 – June 27, 1983) was born in Montreal, Canada and was an American football halfback in the National Football League.

He attended Erasmus High School in Brooklyn, New York and graduated from Syracuse University. He weighed in at 184lbs and had a height of 5'11". He was the 47th pick in the 1947 NFL Draft by the Boston Yanks and later played for the Detroit Lions and the New York Bulldogs. He went on to play 3 seasons in the NFL.

References

External links
Database Football

1919 births
Sportspeople from Montreal
Anglophone Quebec people
Gridiron football people from Quebec
Canadian players of American football
American football halfbacks
Syracuse Orange football players
Boston Yanks players
Detroit Lions players
New York Bulldogs players
1983 deaths